The Triumph TR2 is a sports car produced by the Standard Motor Company in the United Kingdom between 1953 and 1955.  It was only available in roadster form.

The body was mounted on a substantial separate chassis with coil-sprung independent suspension at the front and a leaf spring live axle at the rear. Either wire or disc wheels could be supplied. The transmission was a four-speed manual unit, with optional top gear overdrive. Lockheed drum brakes were fitted all round.

A total of 8,636 TR2s were produced. It was replaced by the TR3 in 1955.

History

Standard's Triumph Roadster was out-dated and under-powered.  Company boss Sir John Black tried to acquire the Morgan Motor Company but failed. He still wanted an affordable sports car, so a prototype two-seater was built on a shortened version of the Standard Eight's chassis and powered by the Standard Vanguard's 2-litre straight-4.  The resulting Triumph 20TS prototype was revealed at the 1952 London Motor Show.

Black asked BRM development engineer and test driver Ken Richardson to assess the 20TS.  After he declared it to be a "death trap" a project was undertaken to improve on the design;  a year later the TR2 was revealed. It had better looks; a simple ladder-type chassis; a longer body; and a bigger boot. It was loved by American buyers, and became the best earner for Triumph. In 1955 the more powerful TR3 was released, with a re-designed grille and a GT package that included a factory hard-top.

"TR" stands for "Triumph Roadster". Period advertising name the car T.R.2. The periods were replaced by a single hyphen when the TR-3 was introduced. 

As of 2011 there were approximately 377 licensed and 52 SORN TR2s of the 8,636 TR2s produced registered with the DVLA in the UK; in the United States 1,800 were known to survive.

Performance
The test car cost £900 including taxes and £56 for overdrive.

The magazine also commented that the TR2 was the lowest price British car able to exceed .

In motorsport
Concentrating on rapid entry into the lucrative US sports car market, Standard-Triumph had given little thought to the competitive potential of their new TR2 roadster. Two events would highlight this omission: the Jabbeke Tests, and early privateer rally victories.

Employing a production TR2 with optional streamlining equipment (Under-shield (Part #502122), Rear-wing spats, Metal cockpit cover), Triumph attained a speed of 124.889 mph on the closed Jabbeke motorway in Belgium in May 1953. The following March, customer TR2s took 1st, 2nd, and 5th places in the prestigious RAC Rally. The publicity derived from these accomplishments led the factory to establish a Competition Department under the leadership of Ken Richardson, supporting both works and customer cars.

Between 1954 and 1955, the TR2 was campaigned in the Mille Miglia, the Ulster TT at Dundrod, the Grand Prix of Macao, Lockbourne Races (USA), the Alpine, Monte Carlo, RAC, Thousand Island (Canada), Liege-Rome-Liege, Nigeria 24-Hour, 3rd ADAG Gruenewaldfahrt, Circuit of Ireland, Soleil-Cannes, RSAC, and Tulip rallies, among others, earning numerous Outright, Team, and Class awards including the coveted Coupe des Alpes.

In 1955, a Triumph works team of three modified TR2s (disc brakes, larger carburetors, Jabbeke windscreens) were entered in the 24 Heures du Mans. Reaching speeds of up to 120 mph on the Mulsanne Straight, the team would complete the legendary endurance race in 14th, 15th, and 19th positions. Some of the modifications on these cars (Girling disc brakes, carburetors) would subsequently appear on the Triumph TR3.

Doug Whiteford won the 1955 Moomba TT at the Albert Park Circuit in Victoria, Australia driving a Triumph TR2.

References

TR2
Cars introduced in 1953
Roadsters
Rear-wheel-drive vehicles
24 Hours of Le Mans race cars